Skobeli is a rural locality (a village) in Boretskoye Rural Settlement of Vinogradovsky District, Arkhangelsk Oblast, Russia. The population was 4 as of 2010.

Geography 
Skobeli is located on the Severnaya Dvina River, 84 km southeast of Bereznik (the district's administrative centre) by road. Zadorikha is the nearest rural locality.

References 

Rural localities in Vinogradovsky District